The San Diego Film Critics Society Award for Best Foreign Language Film is one of the annual film awards given by the San Diego Film Critics Society.

Winners

1990s

2000s

2010s

2020s

References
San Diego Film Critics Society - Awards

Film awards for Best Foreign Language Film